Suleiman ("Sule") Ladipo (born 9 April 1974 in Enugu) is a male former tennis player from Nigeria, who turned professional in 1993. His name "Ladipo" means "wealth and prosperity" in the Yoruba language. The right-hander represented his native country at the 1996 Summer Olympics in Atlanta, Georgia, where he was defeated in the first round by Australia's Jason Stoltenberg. He reached his highest singles ATP-ranking on 3 April 1996, when he was ranked 245th in the world. He currently resides in Indianapolis, Indiana, coaching at Indianapolis Racquet Club East.

External links
 

1974 births
Living people
Sportspeople from Enugu
Nigerian male tennis players
Tennis players at the 1996 Summer Olympics
Olympic tennis players of Nigeria
Yoruba sportspeople
Nigerian emigrants to the United States